Umar Ata Bandial (born 17 September 1958) is a Pakistani jurist who currently serves as the 28th Chief Justice of Pakistan . His appointment as the new Chief Justice was approved by President Arif Alvi on 13 January 2022, after which he assumed his office on 2 February 2022.

He has been a Justice of the Supreme Court of Pakistan since 17 June 2014. Prior to his appointment to the Supreme Court, he served as a Justice of Lahore High Court from 1 June 2012 to 16 June 2014.

Bandial will serve as the Chief Justice of Pakistan for one year, six months, and 25 days from 2 February 2022, until his retirement on 16 September 2023.

Early life and education 
In 1973, Bandial received his Senior Cambridge certificate from St Mary's Academy, Rawalpindi. He then enrolled in  Aitchison College, Lahore, for his Higher Senior Cambridge certificate, which he received in 1975. He received his bachelor's degree in economics from Columbia University in 1979 and followed this with a Law Tripos degree from the University of Cambridge in 1981. He qualified as a Barrister-at-Law from Lincoln's Inn, London.

Career 
Bandial joined the Lahore High Court as an advocate in 1983. He also taught torts law and contract law at the Punjab University Law College in Lahore until 1987, after which he served on its Graduate Studies Committee. He then was made a Judge of the Lahore High Court. After a few years, he became a Judge of the Supreme Court of Pakistan.

Lahore High Court 
He was elevated as a Judge of the Lahore High Court on 4 December 2004. He was one of the judges who refused to take an oath under the Provisional Constitutional Order, preferring to resign instead. He was restored as a LHC judge as a result of the Lawyers' Movement.

As a judge of the Lahore High Court, he presided over cases related to constitutional rights, civil and commercial disputes, and public interest. On 1 June 2012, he was appointed as the 41st Chief Justice of Lahore High Court. He served at that post until his appointment as a Supreme Court judge on 16 June 2014.

Supreme Court of Pakistan 
Bandial's appointment as the Chief Justice of Pakistan (CJP) was approved by Alvi on 13 January 2022. He was sworn in on 2 February 2022, in a ceremony at Aiwan-e-Sadr.

In his first month, he initiated reforms in various organs of the Supreme Court, including the Case Management System, to ensure provision of speedy justice. He reorganized the bodies that dealt with administrative and judicial powers, including the building committee, record enrolment committee, Supreme Court research affairs branch, and law clerk programme. He appointed Qazi Faez Isa, Sardar Tariq Masood, Ijazul Ahsan, Mazhar Alam, and Sajjad Ali Shah as the monitoring judges of the provincial anti-terrorism courts of Balochistan, Islamabad, Punjab, Khyber Pakhtunkhwa, and Sindh, respectively.

As the CJP, Justice Bandial was elected as chairman of the Supreme Judicial Council, Judicial Commission of Pakistan, and Law and Justice Commission. The structure of these three bodies was changed completely.

In his first month as CJP, the Supreme Court decided a record 1,761 cases in an effort to address the issue of pendency. Senior lawyers noted the discipline in the fixation of cases and formation of benches.

In 2022, he was named among the Time 100 most influential people.

References

1958 births
Living people
Justices of the Supreme Court of Pakistan
Pakistani judges
Aitchison College alumni
Alumni of the University of Cambridge
Chief Justices of the Lahore High Court
Columbia College (New York) alumni
Chief justices of Pakistan